The Terre Haute Metropolitan Statistical Area, also known as the Wabash Valley, is the 227th largest Metropolitan Statistical Area (MSA) in the United States.   Centering on the city of Terre Haute, Indiana, it was originally formed by the United States Census Bureau in 1950 and consisted of Vigo County. As surrounding counties saw an increase in their population densities and the number of their residents employed within Vigo County, they met Census criteria to be added to the MSA. Four Indiana counties are now a part of this MSA.

External links
U.S. Census Bureau State & County QuickFacts
U.S. Census Bureau population estimates
Metropolitan and Micropolitan Statistical Areas
About Metropolitan and Micropolitan Statistical Areas
Historical Metropolitan Area Definitions

 
Vigo County, Indiana
Clay County, Indiana
Sullivan County, Indiana
Vermillion County, Indiana